Zliechov (until 1899 ) is a village and municipality in Ilava District in the Trenčín Region of north-western Slovakia. It has a population of 607.

History
In historical records the village was first mentioned in 1272.

Geography
The municipality lies at an altitude of 603 metres and covers an area of 54.377 km².

The village is located within the Strážov Mountains Protected Landscape Area and close to Strážov Mountain (1,213 m).

References

External links

Official website

Villages and municipalities in Ilava District